Hart was an electoral district of the House of Assembly in the Australian state of South Australia from 1993 to 2002. The district was based in the north-western suburbs of Adelaide.

The abolished seat of Semaphore became Hart for the 1993 election. Hart was a safe Labor seat. Hart was redistributed prior to the 1997 election, becoming much larger, covering most of what is now the seat of Port Adelaide. Hart was replaced by Port Adelaide at the  2002 election.

Members for Hart

Election results

Former electoral districts of South Australia
1993 establishments in Australia
2002 disestablishments in Australia